Dennis Meredith , born in Adelaide, South Australia, is a former member of the Australia National Field Hockey Team playing 22 times for his country.

He then moved to officiating and became a World Cup and Olympic International Umpire (field hockey). Meredith went on to become an International Hockey Federation Umpire's Manager and Technical Delegate, and between 1999 and 2000 he worked in the role of FIH Umpiring Development Officer for Asia.

During the period 2001 to 2010, he acted in the role of Competition and Events Manager for the International Hockey Federation, responsible for the coordination of all major international hockey events throughout the world (men and women).

He was the Event Delegate for the hockey competitions at the inaugural 2010 Summer Youth Olympics.

Meredith was seconded to the Organising Committee of the 2010 Commonwealth Games, New Delhi and in his capacity as the Hockey Sports Manager, coordinated the organisation of the men’s and women’s hockey competitions at the Games.
In 2011 he was appointed as the Technical Director of World Series Hockey (WSH), a franchise based professional hockey league.  WSH was a joint initiative between the Indian Hockey Federation  and Nimbus Sport, played with eight teams across India.

During his extensive involvement in a variety of volunteer and administrative roles in hockey spanning 7 decades, Meredith contributed heavily to the local South Australian hockey community, and held the role of President of the Port Adelaide District Hockey Club from 2016–2022, 1991–1994, 1987–1989, and 1974–1977.

Dennis Meredith was appointed a Member (AM) of the Order of Australia (General Division) in the 2019 Queen’s Birthday Honours  in recognition of his significant service to hockey through roles at the local, state, national and international level.

Dennis Meredith is the father of Andrew Meredith, currently Analysis Operations Manager of Manchester United Football Club and who was also involved in Hockey, as the former Assistant Coach of the Germany men's national field hockey team, prior to an 18 month period as Head Coach of the Ireland national field hockey team.

Books 
He has written numerous educational manuals, and one book on the subject of youth hockey umpiring: "Handbook for junior hockey umpires"

Awards 
1982 – Australian Hockey Association Award of Merit
1986 – Inaugural recipient of International Hockey Federation Guust Lauthowers Trophy for services to the development of international hockey umpiring.
1994 – South Australian Hockey Association Life Membership
1997 – Official of the Year (Men’s Hockey) – Australian Sports Commission National Officiating Program
2000 – Australian Sports Medal – Awarded by the Commonwealth Government
2002 – Hockey Australia Life Membership
2019 – Order of Australia (General Division)

References 

 The International Hockey Federation (FIH) History
 1980 Australian Hockey Association Annual Report
 2010 Commonwealth Games New Delhi

External links 
Bio 1959–2000
Handbook for junior hockey umpires
Hockey Federation (FIH)

1945 births
Living people
Australian male field hockey players
Members of the Order of Australia